Daviesia euphorbioides, commonly known as Wongan cactus, is a species of flowering plant in the family Fabaceae and is endemic to a restricted area in the south-west of Western Australia. It is an open, erect to sprawling, cactus-like shrub with thick, fleshy branchlets and phyllodes reduced to scattered, sharply-pointed spines, and bright yellow, reddish-brown and maroon flowers.

Description

Taxonomy and naming
Daviesia euphorbioides was first formally described in 1864 by George Bentham in Flora Australiensis from specimens collected by James Drummond. The specific epithet (euphorbioides) means "Euphorbia-like".

Distribution and habitat
Wongan cactus grows on flats and sandplains, often in disturbed areas, between Wongan Hills, Dowerin and the Moonijin Nature Reserve in the Avon Wheatbelt biogeographic region of south-western Western Australia.

Conservation status
Daviesia euphorbioides is classed as "Threatened Flora (Declared Rare Flora — Extant)" by the Department of Biodiversity, Conservation and Attractions.

References

euphorbioides
Eudicots of Western Australia
Plants described in 1864
Taxa named by George Bentham